Valemount Airport  is located  northwest of Valemount, British Columbia, Canada, is owned and operated by the Village of Valemount.

References

Registered aerodromes in British Columbia
Regional District of Fraser-Fort George